Olivier Perrier (born 15 September 1940) is a French actor. He appeared in more than forty films since 1972.

Selected filmography

References

External links 

1940 births
Living people
French male film actors